was one of the administrative divisions of Taiwan during the Japanese rule. The prefecture consisted of modern-day Kaohsiung City and Pingtung County.

Population

Administrative divisions

Cities and districts
In 1945 (Shōwa 20), there were 2 cities and 7 districts.

Towns and villages
The districts were divided into towns (街) and villages (庄).

See also 
Political divisions of Taiwan (1895-1945)
Governor-General of Taiwan
Taiwan under Japanese rule
Administrative divisions of the Republic of China

Former prefectures of Japan in Taiwan